Rotula aquatica is a species of aromatic flowering shrub in the borage family, Boraginaceae. It is a rare rheophyte native to India, where it is a member of the lotic ecosystem of streams.

The plant is a mandatory component of many ayurvedic drug preparations and is an important traditional medicine for kidney and bladder stones. The root tuber is astringent, bitter, diuretic and also useful in treating coughs, heart diseases, dysuria, blood disorders, fever, poisonings, ulcers and uterine diseases. Root decoctions are both diuretic and laxative and are used to treat bladder stones and sexually transmitted diseases. Plants were exploited for their medicinal properties by excavating the roots, causing them to die. A study has shown that a protocol consisting of ex vitro rooting, commercial sugar, and tap water, can be economically advantageous.

References

External links

Ehretioideae
Flora of China
Flora of tropical Asia
Freshwater plants